is a railway station in the city of Utsunomiya, Tochigi Prefecture Japan, operated by the East Japan Railway Company (JR East). The station also is a freight depot for the Japan Freight Railway Company (JR Freight).

Tōbu-Utsunomiya Station is located 1.6 km west of this station.

Lines
Utsunomiya Station is served by the following JR East lines.
 Tōhoku Shinkansen
  Utsunomiya Line (Tōhoku Main Line)
  Shōnan–Shinjuku Line (Direct service to Zushi and Shinjuku via the Utsunomiya Line from Utsunomiya to Ōmiya.)
 Nikkō Line
 Karasuyama Line (Limited direct service. Most trips require a transfer at Hōshakuji.)

In addition, Utsunomiya Station will be the terminus of the Utsunomiya Light Rail line.

Layout

The elevated Shinkansen platforms are designed to handle 16-car trains. Inbound and Outbound trains have their own platform. An additional two through (passing) tracks (lines 2 and 3) are located between the platforms.

The platforms for local trains are a combination of both island and individual platforms, designed to handle 15-car trains. A side track (often used for freight trains) is located between platforms 5 and 7.

LED information signboards are located on the 2nd-floor concourse both outside and within the ticket gates. Further LED signboards are located on each individual platform.

Platforms

Some Nikkō Line trains operate from platform 7. Some Utsunomiya Line trains operate from platform 5.

History

 July 16, 1885: Station opens on what is now the Tōhoku Main Line.
 June 1, 1890: Nikkō Line begins operation
 June 23, 1982: Tōhoku Shinkansen begins operation
 November 18, 2001: Introduction of Suica-enabled ticket gates.
 October 12, 2003: Introduction of Suica-enabled ticket gates for Shinkansen passes.
 January 29, 2008: Introduction of Suica-only ticket gates.
 March 2019: Discontiued operating services bound for Takasaki Station via Shin-Maebashi Station on Ryomo Line, which last for 60 years since 1958.

Passenger statistics

In fiscal 2019, the station was used by an average of 37,374 passengers daily (boarding passengers only).

Bus routes

West Exit

Track 1,2

Track 3
It is possible for passengers who have valid Japan Rail Pass to use following all bus routes operated by JR Bus Kanto at free.

Track 4 
Buses bound for Tōbu-Utsunomiya Station or Sakushin Gakuin University via Babacho and Prefectural Hall depart from and arrive at this track operated by JR Bus Kanto. All services come from Motegi Station via Haga Bus Terminal and Bell Mall.

Track 5 
Buses bound for Fujimigaoka via Hanada and Utsunomiya Commercial high school or Takebayashi and FKD operated by Kanto Transportation depart from and arrive at this track.

Track 6 
Buses bound for Otani Kaido Avenue via Babacho and Prefectural operated by Kanto Transportation depart from and arrive at this track.

Track 7

Track 8

Track 9

Track 10

Track 11

Track 12 
 ［25］Suzumenomiya Jieitai・Ishibashi Station (Tochigi) via Ishibashi Highschool 
 ［36］Tsuruta Station via Rokudo tsuji・Nishi Kawada higashi
 ［41］Tochigi Prefectural Driver License Center・Niregi Shako via Niregi Station
 Free Shuttle Bus - Utsunomiya Velodrome

Track 13 
 ［34］Tsuruta Station via Yozei Dori
 ［37］Tsuruta Station・Nishi-Kawada Station via Sakura Dori

Track 14 
Former Toya Kotsu (Kanto Transportation)
 Kazuhisa via Imaizumi 9 chome
 Okamoto Station (Tochigi) via Ueno Danchi
 Ujiie Station via Okamoto Station (Tochigi) and Hōshakuji Station
 Bell Mall／Seppo-ji／Kameyama／Hashiba/Mooka Office via Mōka Station
 Mashiko Station via Nanai Station and Togei Messe iriguchi ※There are partly services pass through Bell Mall
 Kaisei Joshi Gakuin
 Takebayahsi Jumonji／Hiraide Industrial Apartment Complex via Mine
 Bell Mall

Track 15 

Toya Kotsu (Kanto Transportation)
Okamoto Station (Tochigi) via Miyukigahara Motomachi

Track 16 
Highway buses operated by Kanto Transportation depart from and arrive at this track.

 Marronnier (For Narita International Airport) (Kanto Transportation・Chiba Kotsu)
 Marronnier (For Haneda Airport) (Kanto Transportation・Airport Transport Service)
 Tochinoki (For Universal Studios Japan via Kyōto Station・Ōsaka Station) (Kanto Transportation・Kintetsu Bus)
 Night bus Nagoya Line (For Nagoya Station) (Fukushima Transportation・Meitetsu Bus)
 Kita-Kanto Liner (For Mito Station via Akatsuka Station) (Kanto Transportation・Ibaraki Transportation)
 School Bus - Sakushin Gakuin University

Track 38 
 [34] Utsunomiya City Circular-route Bus "Kibuna"

East Exit

Track 3

Track 4

See also
 List of railway stations in Japan

References

External links

  

Stations of East Japan Railway Company
Stations of Japan Freight Railway Company
Tōhoku Shinkansen
Railway stations in Tochigi Prefecture
Tōhoku Main Line
Nikkō Line
Utsunomiya Line
Karasuyama Line
Railway stations in Japan opened in 1885
Utsunomiya